David George Ouellet (June 13, 1944 – March 6, 1967) was a US Navy seaman, and received the Medal of Honor for his actions in the Vietnam War.

Biography
Ouellet was born in Newton, Massachusetts.  After finishing school, he enlisted in the United States Navy July 28, 1964 and upon completion of his training, joined Assault Craft Division Twelve for duty in Vietnam. After five months in Vietnam, he was ordered to San Diego, California for training in river patrol boats. Upon completion of this training, he returned to Vietnam and joined River Squadron Five, My Tho Detachment 532. He was on patrol in PBR–124 on March 6, 1967, as the forward machine gunner. While patrolling near a river bank, Seaman Ouellet saw an enemy grenade coming towards his boat. He ran back towards the stern shouting for everybody to take cover and when seeing the boat captain unprotected, he pushed him down a hatch to safety. Between the split second the missile landed in the boat and exploded, Seaman Ouellet placed himself between the missile and his shipmates and absorbed the impact of the blast. As a result, Seaman Ouellet was mortally wounded. For his heroic sacrifice, he was posthumously awarded the Medal of Honor. He is buried at Woodlawn Cemetery in Wellesley, Massachusetts. His name is listed on the Vietnam Veterans Memorial on panel 16E, Row 030.

Medal of Honor citation
Seaman David G. Ouellet, United States Navy, (posthumous), Seaman, U.S. Navy, River Squadron 5, My Tho Detachment 532., Mekong River, Republic of Vietnam, March 6, 1967.

For conspicuous gallantry and intrepidity at the risk of his life above and beyond the call of duty while serving with River Section 532, in combat against the enemy in the Republic of Vietnam. As the forward machine gunner on River Patrol Boat (PBR) 124, which was on patrol on the Mekong River during the early evening hours of March 6, 1967, Seaman Ouellet observed suspicious activity near the river bank, alerted his Boat Captain, and recommended movement of the boat to the area to investigate. While the PBR was making a high-speed run along the river bank, Seaman Ouellet spotted an incoming enemy grenade falling toward the boat. He immediately left the protected position of his gun mount and ran aft for the full length of the speeding boat, shouting to his fellow crew members to take cover. Observing the Boat Captain standing unprotected on the boat, Seaman Ouellet bounded onto the engine compartment cover, and pushed the Boat Captain down to safety. In the split second that followed the grenade's landing, and in the face of certain death, Seaman Ouellet fearlessly placed himself between the deadly missile and his shipmates, courageously absorbing most of the blast fragments with his own body in order to protect his shipmates from injury and death. His extraordinary heroism and his selfless and courageous actions on behalf of his comrades at the expense of his own life were in the finest tradition of the United States Naval Service.

Decorations and medals

Other Honors

See also

List of Medal of Honor recipients for the Vietnam War

References
Inline

General

External links

Webarchive template wayback links
1944 births
1967 deaths
People from Newton, Massachusetts
United States Navy Medal of Honor recipients
United States Navy sailors
American military personnel killed in the Vietnam War
Vietnam War recipients of the Medal of Honor
Deaths by hand grenade
United States Navy personnel of the Vietnam War